Faecalibacterium is a genus of bacteria. Its sole known species, Faecalibacterium prausnitzii is gram-positive, mesophilic, rod-shaped, anaerobic and is one of the most abundant and important commensal bacteria of the human gut microbiota. It is non-spore forming and non-motile. These bacteria produce butyrate and other short-chain fatty acids through the fermentation of dietary fiber.

History 
Formerly considered to be a member of Fusobacterium, the bacterium is named in honor of German bacteriologist Otto Prausnitz. In 2002, it was proposed to be reclassified as its own genus, Faecalibacterium, containing the species Faecalibacterium prausnitzii, as phylogenetic analysis from isolates showed it to be only distantly related to Fusobacterium, and a closer member of Clostridium cluster IV.

Genetics 
Faecalibacterium prausnitzii has a genome 2,868,932 bp long and has a GC-content of 56.9%. The bacterium has been found to have 2,707 coding sequences, including 77 RNAs encoding genes. 128 metabolic pathways have been reconstructed, as well as 27 protein complexes and 64 tRNAs. Phylogenetically, the strains of F. prausnitzii compose phylogroups I and II. Most of the new isolates of this species isolated by M. Tanweer Khan belong to phylogroup II. A protein produced by this bacterium has been linked to anti-inflammatory effects.

Clinical relevance 
In healthy adults, Faecalibacterium prausnitzii represent more than 5% of the bacteria in the intestine, making it one of the most common gut bacteria. It has anti-inflammatory properties and may improve the imbalance in intestinal bacteria that leads to dysbiosis.  Lower than usual levels of F. prausnitzii in the intestines have been associated with Crohn's disease, obesity, asthma and major depressive disorder,
and higher than usual levels have been associated with psoriasis. Faecalibacterium prausnitzii can improve gut barrier function.

Inflammatory bowel disease 
In Crohn's disease, as of 2015 most studies (with one exception) found reduced levels of F. prausnitzii; this has been found in both fecal and mucosal samples. However, it is a fastidious organism sensitive to oxygen and difficult to deliver to the intestine.

Exclusive enteral nutrition, which is known to induce remission in Crohn's, has been found to reduce F. prausnitzii in responders.

References 

Eubacteriales
Monotypic bacteria genera